Christchurch Casino is a casino in Christchurch, New Zealand, owned by Skyline Entertainment. The  casino was New Zealand's first when it opened in 1994. The casino operates five hundred slot machines and thirty-four table games. The property has two restaurants and one bar. Entry is restricted to patrons over 20 and dressed accordingly.

Ownership
On 29 June 2004, SkyCity Entertainment Group announced that it had settled the acquisition of Aspinall (NZ) Limited, which held a 40.5% shareholding in Christchurch Casinos Limited.  The purchase price was NZ$93.75 million (on a debt free basis). The deal marked the end of an era for Aspinall.

Skyline Enterprises, which controls a 41 per cent stake in the casino, had opposed SkyCity's purchase of a matching stake from Aspinall earlier in 2004.  As part of his resistance to the deal, Mr. Thomas had refused to cooperate overdue diligence.  Skyline had attempted to purchase the 41 per cent stake from Aspinall but had been rebuffed.

Skyline Enterprises chairman Barry Thomas had objected to the SkyCity purchase on the basis that it gave SkyCity an interest in five out of six New Zealand casinos.  The deal was nonetheless approved by both the Casino Control Authority and the Commerce Commission.  In clearing SkyCity's application, the Commerce Commission said that the deal would not substantially restrict competition in the Auckland, Christchurch and Dunedin casino entertainment markets.

SkyCity Entertainment Group Managing Director, Evan Davies, said that SkyCity's acquisition of the shares in Aspinall and its interest in CCL was a logical extension of its New Zealand operations and in line with the company's investment strategy.  The acquisition was motivated in part by the 2003 Gambling Act which outlaws the opening of any new casinos in New Zealand.

In December 2012, both partners reached a deal, in which SkyCity sold its shares in the casino to Skyline for $80 million, and bought Skyline's 40% stake in Skycity Queenstown for $5 million. As a result, Skyline Enterprises became the major owner of Christchurch Casino.

Expansion plans 

In November 2016, Christchurch Casino announced it will build a 200-room hotel. In September 2017, it purchased 4,047 square meters of adjacent bare land at auction.

New Zealand Poker Championships 
Christchurch hosts the New Zealand Poker Championships.

Gallery

See also
Gambling in New Zealand

References

External links

Christchurch Casino

Casinos completed in 1994
Casinos in New Zealand
Gambling companies of New Zealand
Christchurch Central City
Tourist attractions in Christchurch
New Zealand companies established in 1994